André Francquenelle (15 August 1889 – 11 July 1965) was a French athlete and national rugby union player. He competed in the men's pole vault at the 1920 Summer Olympics.

References

External links
 

1889 births
1965 deaths
Athletes (track and field) at the 1920 Summer Olympics
French male pole vaulters
Olympic athletes of France
Place of birth missing
France international rugby union players